Lists of World War II military equipment are lists of military equipment in use during World War II (1939–1945). They include lists of aircraft, ships, vehicles, weapons, personal equipment and uniforms, and other equipment. There are aggregated military equipment lists by country, and lists of classes of equipment broken down by country or by type.

Aircraft 
 List of aircraft of World War II
 List of World War II military aircraft of Germany
 List of German aircraft projects, 1939–45
 List of aircraft of the French Air Force during World War II
 List of aircraft of the United States during World War II
 List of aircraft of the United Kingdom in World War II
 List of aircraft of the Red Army Air Forces
 List of Regia Aeronautica aircraft used in World War II
 List of aircraft of Japan during World War II
List of aircraft of Finland in World War II
 List of aircraft of Poland during World War II
List of aircraft of Greece in World War II
List of aircraft of Yugoslavia in World War II
List of aircraft of Hungary in World War II
List of aircraft of Switzerland in World War II
List of aircraft of Spain in World War II
 List of aircraft of Portugal in World War II
List of aircraft of Ireland in World War II

Ships
 List of ships of World War II
 List of aircraft carriers of World War II
 List of battleships of World War II
 List of battlecruisers of World War II
 List of coastal defence ships of World War II
 List of monitors of World War II
 List of destroyers of World War II
 List of frigates of World War II
 List of corvettes of World War II
 List of minor warships of World War II
 List of cruisers of World War II
 List of submarines of World War II
 List of ship classes of World War II

Vehicles
List of military vehicles of World War II
List of armoured fighting vehicles of World War II
List of prototype World War II combat vehicles

Weapons
 List of World War II weapons
List of common World War II infantry weapons 
 List of secondary and special-issue World War II infantry weapons
 List of World War II firearms of Germany
 List of military equipment of Germany's allies on the Eastern front
 German designations of foreign artillery in World War II
 German designations of foreign firearms in World War II
 List of World War II weapons of Portugal

Aggregated military equipment by country
 List of Australian military equipment of World War II
 List of Belgian military equipment of World War II
 List of British military equipment of World War II
 List of Bulgarian military equipment of World War II
 List of military equipment of the Canadian Army during the Second World War
 List of Chinese military equipment in World War II
 List of Croatian military equipment of World War II
List of Danish military equipment of World War II
 List of Dutch military equipment of World War II
List of Finnish military equipment of World War II
 List of World War II weapons of France
 List of German military equipment of World War II
List of Greek military equipment of World War II
List of Hungarian military equipment of World War II
 List of Japanese military equipment of World War II
List of Norwegian military equipment of World War II
 List of Romanian military equipment of World War II
 List of Thailand military equipment of World War II
 List of Turkish military equipment of World War II
List of aircraft of Ireland in World War II
 List of Italian Army equipment in World War II
 List of equipment of the United States Army during World War II
 List of Soviet Union military equipment of World War II
List of Spanish military equipment of World War II
 List of World War II weapons of Poland
 Military equipment of Sweden during World War II
 List of Portuguese military equipment of World War II
List of Yugoslav military equipment of World War II

Personal equipment and uniforms
 List of World War II uniforms and clothing

Other equipment
 List of World War II electronic warfare equipment

See also 
 Lists of military equipment